Bolemir (also Romanized as Bolemīr and Bol Amīr; also known as Boneh Mīr and Bulamīr) is a village in Zayandeh Rud-e Shomali Rural District, in the Central District of Faridan County, Isfahan Province, Iran. At the 2006 census, its population was 755, in 181 families.

References 

Populated places in Faridan County